Menace is a 1934 British crime film directed by Adrian Brunel and starring Victor Varconi, Joan Maude and D. A. Clarke-Smith. The film was made at Shepperton Studios by the Sound City production company. It was released in America under the alternative titles When London Sleeps and Without Warning.

Cast
 Victor Varconi as Stephen Ronsart 
 Joan Maude as Lady Conway 
 D. A. Clarke-Smith as Sir Robert Conway 
 Hubert Leslie as Mr. Jones 
 Joan Matheson as Mrs. Jones 
 J.A. O'Rourke as O'Leary 
 Shayle Gardner as Commissioner 
 Wilfred Noy as Dean

Bibliography
 Chibnall, Steve. Quota Quickies: The Birth of the British 'B' film. British Film Institute, 2007.
 Low, Rachael. History of the British Film: Filmmaking in 1930s Britain. George Allen & Unwin, 1985 .

External links

1934 films
1934 crime films
British crime films
Films shot at Shepperton Studios
Films directed by Adrian Brunel
British black-and-white films
1930s English-language films
1930s British films